The wedding of Princess Beatrix of the Netherlands and Claus van Amsberg took place on Thursday, 10 March 1966, in Amsterdam, Netherlands. They were married first in a civil ceremony at the Prinsenhof, after which the marriage was religiously blessed in the Westerkerk. The bride was the eldest daughter of Queen Juliana and heir presumptive to the Dutch throne. The groom was an untitled German nobleman. The engagement of the future queen to a German caused an uproar among some Dutch people and the wedding was marred by protests.  

Beatrix later reigned as Queen of the Netherlands from 1980 until her abdication in 2013.

Engagement

Princess Beatrix, heir presumptive to Queen Juliana of the Netherlands, first met Claus von Amsberg, an untitled German nobleman, at a New Year's Eve party in Bad Driburg in 1962. They met again later at the wedding of Moritz, Hereditary Prince of Hesse, and Princess Tatiana of Sayn-Wittgenstein-Berleburg in Giessen in the summer of 1964. The couple began dating, often using Richard, 6th Prince of Sayn-Wittgenstein-Berleburg, as a decoy for the press. Later, on a skiing holiday in Gstaad, Beatrix and Claus were spotted together while Prince Richard was spotted skiing alone.

The engagement was announced by Queen Juliana and her husband, Prince Bernhard, on 28 June 1965. After the announcement, the couple met the press in the gardens of Soestdijk Palace and granted an interview to Herman Felderhof. Queen Juliana and the States General granted their consent to the engagement. Amsberg was granted Dutch citizenship later in 1965 and changed the spelling of his name from the German "Klaus von Amsberg" to the Dutch "Claus van Amsberg".

Pre-wedding celebrations

A number of pre-wedding balls, dinners, receptions and concerts were held in the weeks leading up to the wedding. These began on 5 March, when the Dutch Government hosted a gala dinner at the Museum Het Prinsenhof in Delft, the last residence of William the Silent. Princess Beatrix wore a lavender gown and Queen Emma's small diamond tiara.

On 8 March, Queen Juliana and Prince Bernhard hosted a white tie pre-wedding dinner at the Hilton Amsterdam followed by a ball at the Royal Palace of Amsterdam attended by the foreign royal guests. Princess Beatrix wore a white and blue embroidered gown with the antique pearl tiara. The next night, on the eve of the wedding, they hosted a smaller more informal black tie party for 300 guests at the Amstel Hotel. Many of the foreign royal guests were in attendance that evening as well.

Wedding

Civil ceremony
Per Dutch law, a civil marriage ceremony was required before a religious ceremony. This took place at Amsterdam's city hall, the Prinsenhof. The ceremony was performed by Gijsbert van Hall, Mayor of Amsterdam. Witnesses included the bride's paternal uncle, Prince Aschwin of Lippe-Biesterfeld, Britain's Princess Alexandra, and  former Prime Minister, Willem Drees.

Religious ceremony
Following the civil ceremony, the couple travelled in the Golden Coach to the Westerkerk for the religious blessing. The blessing was performed by Rev. Hendrik Jan Kater, with a sermon by Rev. Johannes Hendrik Sillevis Smitt.

Music
Dutch composer Jurriaan Andriessen, composed a piece for organ, Entrata Festiva, for the occasion. Other music at the religious ceremony included the original French version of the hymn À toi la gloire O Ressuscité with words by Edmond Louis Budry and music by George Frideric Handel,

Attire
Princess Beatrix wore a white silk duchesse gown by Caroline Bergé-Farwick of Maison Linette. Beatrix was involved in the design of the gown. Her large waist-length tulle veil was secured by the Württemberg ornate pearl tiara, a Dutch royal heirloom often thought to have been among the wedding gifts of Princess Sophie of Württemberg when she married the future William III of the Netherlands in 1839 though actually made for Queen Wilhelmina in 1897. She also wore a pearl and diamond strawberry leaf brooch from Queen Sophie.

Attendants

Princess Beatrix had six adult bridesmaids:
 Princess Christina of the Netherlands
 Christina von Amsberg
 Princess Christina of Sweden
 Lady Elizabeth Anson
 Joanna Roëll
 Eugénie Loudon

The junior bridesmaids were Daphne Stewart-Clark and Carolijn Alting von Geusau, with page boys Joachim Jencquel and Markus von Oeynhausen-Sierstorpf.

Controversy 

After news of the couple became public, there was intense backlash from some Dutch citizens, politicians and religious leaders due to Amsberg's German roots and membership in the Hitler Youth and the Wehrmacht during the Nazi Regime in World War II. Dutch historian Loe de Jong, then of the NIOD Institute for War, Holocaust and Genocide Studies, led a committee to look into Claus's involvement in the war. The committee cleared him and the engagement was announced.

300,000 people signed a petition against the marriage. There were protests during the wedding procession and a smoke bomb was thrown at the Golden Coach by Provos, resulting in a street battle with police. Protests included slogans like "Claus 'raus!" (Claus out!) and "Mijn fiets terug" ("Return my bicycle" – a reference to German soldiers confiscating Dutch bicycles during World War II). 

In protest, half of the Amsterdam Municipal Council and three of the invited rabbis boycotted the ceremony.

Guests

Relatives of the bride
 The Queen and Prince Consort of the Netherlands, the bride's parents
 The Princess and Prince of Piacenza, the bride's sister and brother-in-law
 Princess Margriet of the Netherlands and Mr. Pieter van Vollenhoven, the bride's sister and her fiancé
 Princess Christina of the Netherlands, the bride's sister
 Princess Bernhard of Lippe-Biesterfeld, the bride's paternal grandmother
 Prince and Princess Aschwin of Lippe-Biesterfeld, the bride's paternal uncle and aunt
 Duke and Duchess Adolf Friedrich of Mecklenburg-Schwerin, the bride's maternal granduncle and grandaunt
 Princess and Prince Heinrich I Reuss of Köstritz, the bride's first cousin once removed, and her husband
 Prince Heinrich VIII Reuss of Köstritz, the bride's second cousin

Relatives of the groom
 Baroness Gösta von Amsberg, the groom's mother
 Christina von Amsberg, the groom's sister
 Baroness George von dem Bussche-Haddenhausen, the groom's maternal grandmother
 Baron and Baroness Julius von dem Bussche-Haddenhausen, the groom's maternal uncle and aunt

Foreign royal guests
 The King and Queen of the Belgians
 The Prince and Princess of Liège
 The King and Queen of the Hellenes
 Princess Irene of Greece and Denmark
 The Grand Duke and Grand Duchess of Luxembourg
 Prince Charles of Luxembourg
 The Crown Prince of Norway (representing the King of Norway)
 Princess Marina, Duchess of Kent (representing the Queen of the United Kingdom)
 Princess Alexandra, The Hon. Mrs. Ogilvy, and The Hon. Angus Ogilvy
 Prince Michael of Kent
 Princess Benedikte of Denmark (representing the King of Denmark)
 Princess Margaretha, Mrs. Ambler, and Mr. John Ambler (representing the King of Sweden)
 Princess Christina of Sweden
 The Prince and Princess of Asturias
 Infanta Pilar of Spain
 The Aga Khan IV

Aftermath

The couple honeymooned in Mexico. Eventually, the Dutch people accepted Claus and he became a beloved prince consort.

They had three sons: Willem-Alexander (born 1967), Friso (1968–2013) and Constantijn (born 1969). Prince Claus died of complications of pneumonia and Parkinson's disease at the Academic Medical Center in Amsterdam on 6 October 2002 after a long illness, aged 76.

See also
 Wedding of Willem-Alexander, Prince of Orange, and Máxima Zorreguieta Cerruti

References

Dutch monarchy
Royal weddings in the 20th century
European royal weddings
Events in Amsterdam
1966 in the Netherlands
1960s in Amsterdam
March 1966 events in Europe